George Newton (13 August 1936 – 23 February 2016) was a male weightlifter who competed for England and Great Britain, and then for New Zealand at the end of his career.

Weightlifting career
He represented England and won a gold medal in 60 kg, at the 1962 British Empire and Commonwealth Games in Perth, Western Australia.

Four years later he stepped up in weight to the -67.5 kg category and went on to win a silver medal and two consecutive gold medals, at the 1966 British Empire and Commonwealth Games in Kingston, Jamaica, the 1970 British Commonwealth Games in Edinburgh, Scotland and the 1974 British Commonwealth Games in Christchurch, New Zealand.

He trained out of the Bethnal Green Weightlifting Club and represented Great Britain at the 1964 Summer Olympics and the 1972 Summer Olympics.

After his fourth Commonwealth Games appearance he remained in New Zealand and represented them in the 1978 Commonwealth Games at the age of 42.

Personal life
He was an electrician by trade.

References

1936 births
2016 deaths
English male weightlifters
New Zealand male weightlifters
Commonwealth Games medallists in weightlifting
Commonwealth Games gold medallists for England
Commonwealth Games silver medallists for England
Weightlifters at the 1962 British Empire and Commonwealth Games
Weightlifters at the 1966 British Empire and Commonwealth Games
Weightlifters at the 1970 British Commonwealth Games
Weightlifters at the 1974 British Commonwealth Games
Weightlifters at the 1978 Commonwealth Games
Weightlifters at the 1972 Summer Olympics
Weightlifters at the 1964 Summer Olympics
Olympic weightlifters of Great Britain
Medallists at the 1962 British Empire and Commonwealth Games
Medallists at the 1970 British Commonwealth Games
Medallists at the 1974 British Commonwealth Games